Bangladeshi Japanese or Japanese Bangladeshi may refer to:
Bangladeshi-Japanese relations
Bangladeshis in Japan